Wiesen is a borough of Bad Staffelstein in Germany.

The borough has 290 residents, 110 guest beds, and 2 Inn-Breweries. In 1998, the village at the foot of the Eierberge placed among the 23 most beautiful boroughs in Bavaria in the "Unser Dorf soll schöner werden – Unser Dorf hat Zukunft" Contest.

References

The information in this article is based on a translation of its German equivalent.

External links
Official Website

Villages in Bavaria